Christopher John Sansom (born 1952) is a British writer of historical crime novels, best known for his Matthew Shardlake series. He was born in Edinburgh and attended George Watson's College in that city, but left the school with no qualifications. Sansom has written about the bullying he suffered there. Subsequently he was educated at the University of Birmingham, where he took a BA and then a PhD in history. After working in a variety of jobs, he decided to retrain as a solicitor. He practised in Sussex as a lawyer for the disadvantaged, before leaving the legal profession to become a full-time writer.  He lives in Sussex.

Work
Sansom came to prominence with the Shardlake series, his historical mystery series set in the reign of Henry VIII in the 16th century.  The series' main character is the hunchbacked lawyer Matthew Shardlake, who is assisted in his adventures by Mark Poer, then Jack Barak and also Nicholas Overton. Shardlake works on commission initially from Thomas Cromwell in Dissolution and Dark Fire, then Archbishop Thomas Cranmer in Sovereign and Revelation, Queen Catherine Parr in Heartstone and Lamentation and finally Princess Elizabeth in Tombland. Dark Fire won the 2005 Crime Writers' Association Historical Dagger.

After Dark Fire was published, a Sunday Times review made this comment: "Historical crime fiction is sometimes little more than a modern adventure in fancy dress. Not so the novels of CJ Sansom, whose magnificent books set in the reign of Henry VIII bring to life the sounds and smells of Tudor England..."

Shardlake works as a lawyer in the service of Henry's younger daughter, the Lady Elizabeth, in the novel Tombland (published in 2018), investigating a murder during the time of Kett's Rebellion in Norfolk. "Tombland is more of a grand historical epic than a tightly packed whodunnit, like some of the earlier novels; but 800 pages in Shardlake’s company will always fly by".
 Dissolution was adapted in 10 episodes for BBC Radio 4 in September 2012, and Revelation in March 2017.

Sansom explained his reasons for making his protagonist a barrister, in an interview with The Guardian."I thought it made sense for Shardlake to be a lawyer for a number of reasons. First, the law was my profession: I find legal practice endlessly interesting. Second, it existed then and now, so it provides a point of contact for readers. And third, it's democratic: it offers a way into any number of mysteries, and puts Shardlake in the way of an endless variety of characters." Sansom also said that he plans to write further Shardlake novels taking the lawyer into the reign of Elizabeth I.

He has also written Winter in Madrid, a thriller set in Spain in 1940 in the aftermath of the Spanish Civil War and Dominion, an alternate history novel set in a Britain following a fictional Axis victory in World War II. About the latter novel, a Guardian review called the premise "an invented mid-20th century Britain that has the intricate detail and delineation of JRR Tolkien's Middle Earth, though thankfully described in better prose".

Awards
Dark Fire won the 2005 Ellis Peters Historical Dagger, awarded by the Crime Writers' Association (CWA).  Sansom himself was "Very Highly Commended" in the 2007 CWA Dagger in the Library award, for the Shardlake series. Dominion won the Sidewise Award for Alternate History. In 2022, Sansom received the Cartier Diamond Dagger from the CWA.

Politics
Sansom was born in Scotland. He strongly opposes Scottish independence and described the prospect as "literally heartbreaking". In his 2012 novel Dominion, his depiction of an alternate history in which Germany wins the Second World War, the Scottish National Party collaborates with the British Nazi state. He stated, "A party which is often referred to by its members, as the SNP is, as the National Movement should send a chill down the spine of anyone who remembers what those words have often meant in Europe". He also pointed out that in real life, some of the party's members then had fascist sympathies.

He went on to describe the party as "deeply dangerous, with no politics in the conventional sense, believing only in the old dream that the unleashing of 'national spirit' and 'national pride' can solve a country's problems". He donated £294,000 to the Better Together group which campaigned for a "no" vote in the 2014 Scottish independence referendum. He also said that the Yes Scotland campaign had "dubious" financial backing.

Bibliography

Matthew Shardlake Series

Other novels

References

External links
 Schoolboy rivalries in the Spanish civil war A review of Winter in Madrid, in Telegraph, 26 February 2006
A wherry across the Thames A review of Dark Fire, by Stella Duffy, in The Guardian, 6 November 2004
Spanish Civil War, stripped of Hemingway's romance A review of Winter in Madrid, by Katherine Bailey, in The Philadelphia Inquirer, 20 January 2008
Revelation A review of "Revelation", by Peter Kemp, in The Sunday Times, 27 April 2008
Romanttinen vakoojatarina A review of Finnish translated Winter in Madrid, by Jari Olavi Hiltunen, in Opettaja 21 May 2010
Dominion A review of Dominion, in Upcoming4.me 12 July 2013
Reviews & excerpts of Winter in Madrid, Revelation and Dominion at BookBrowse 2008–2014

1952 births
Living people
21st-century British novelists
British mystery writers
Alumni of the University of Birmingham
British historical novelists
British male novelists
Writers from Edinburgh
Sidewise Award winners
Writers of historical mysteries
21st-century British male writers
Writers of historical fiction set in the early modern period
Cartier Diamond Dagger winners